This is a list of schools in the Borough of Wokingham in the English county of Berkshire.

State-funded schools

Primary schools 

Alder Grove CE Primary School, Shinfield
Aldryngton Primary School, Earley
All Saints CE Primary School, Wokingham
Bearwood Primary School, Sindlesham
Beechwood Primary School, Woodley
The Colleton Primary School, Twyford
The Coombes CE Primary School, Arborfield
Crazies Hill CE Primary School, Crazies Hill
Earley St Peter's CE Primary School, Earley
Emmbrook Infant School, Emmbrook
Emmbrook Junior School, Emmbrook
Evendons Primary School, Wokingham
Farley Hill Primary School, Arborfield Green
Finchampstead CE Primary School, Finchampstead
Floreat Montague Park Primary School, Wokingham
Gorse Ride Infants' School, Finchampstead
Gorse Ride Junior School, Finchampstead
Grazeley Parochial CE Primary School, Grazeley
Hatch Ride Primary School, Gardeners Green
Hawkedon Primary School, Lower Earley
The Hawthorns Primary School, Woosehill
Highwood Primary School, Woodley
Hillside Primary School, Lower Earley
Keep Hatch Primary School, Wokingham
Lambs Lane Primary School, Spencers Wood
Loddon Primary School, Earley
Nine Mile Ride Primary School, Finchampstead
Oaklands Infant School, Gardeners Green
Oaklands Junior School, Gardeners Green
Polehampton CE Infant School, Twyford
Polehampton CE Junior School, Twyford
Radstock Primary School, Lower Earley
Rivermead Primary School, Woodley
Robert Piggott CE Infant School, Wargrave
Robert Piggott CE Junior School, Wargrave
St Cecilia's CE Primary School, Wokingham
St Dominic Savio RC Primary School, Woodley
St Nicholas CE Primary School, Hurst
St Paul's CE Junior School, Wokingham
St Sebastian's CE Primary School, Wokingham
St Teresa's RC Academy, Wokingham
Shinfield Infant School, Shinfield
Shinfield St Mary's CE Junior School, Shinfield
Sonning CE Primary School, Sonning
South Lake Primary School, Woodley
Walter Infant School, Wokingham
Wescott Infant School, Wokingham
Westende Junior School, Wokingham
Wheatfield Primary School, Winnersh
Whiteknights Primary School, Shinfield
Willowbank Infant School, Woodley
Willowbank Junior School, Woodley
Windmill Primary School, Woosehill
Winnersh Primary School, Winnersh
Woodley CE Primary School, Woodley

Secondary schools

Bohunt School Wokingham, Arborfield
The Bulmershe School, Woodley
The Emmbrook School, Emmbrook
The Forest School, Winnersh
The Holt School, Wokingham
Maiden Erlegh School, Earley
The Piggott School, Wargrave
Oakbank School, Ryeish Green
St Crispin's School, Wokingham
Waingels College, Woodley

Special and alternative schools
Addington School, Woodley
Chiltern Way Academy, Wokingham
Foundry College, Wokingham
Willow House Hospital Education, Wokingham

Further education
Bracknell and Wokingham College

Independent schools

Primary and preparatory schools
Dolphin School, Hurst
Ludgrove School, Wixenford
OneSchool Global UK, Shinfield
Our Lady's Preparatory School, Gardeners Green
Waverley Preparatory School, Finchampstead

Senior and all-through schools
Crosfields School, Shinfield
Holme Grange School, Wokingham
Luckley House School, Wokingham
Reading Blue Coat School, Sonning
Reddam House, Wokingham
The Vine Christian School, Three Mile Cross

Special and alternative schools
High Close School, Wokingham
 

Wokingham
Schools in the Borough of Wokingham
School